Juan Allende-Blin (born 24 February 1928) is a Chilean composer and academic teacher who lives in Germany.

Career 
He then studied at the University of Santiago, and with Olivier Messiaen at the Darmstädter Ferienkurse. He was professor of musical analysis at the University of Santiago from 1954 to 1957. In 1957 he moved to Germany and worked from 1962 for the broadcaster Norddeutscher Rundfunk in Hamburg. He has lived as a free-lance composer in Essen, together with the composer and organist Gerd Zacher, until Zacher's death.

Allende-Blin composed instrumental music, two ballets, chansons and music for tape. He reconstructed and orchestrated Debussy's unfinished opera La Chute de la Maison Usher. As a music publicist, he wrote about musicians and exile.

Selected works 
Transformationen for brass, percussion, celesta and piano
Profils for clarinet, trumpet, trombone, cello and percussion
Magnetfelder for piano, clarinet, double bass and tape
Transformations III for percussion, 1952
Transformations IV for Klavier, 1960
Echelons for organ, 1962–68
Silences interrompus for clarinet, double bass and piano, 1969/1970
Mein blaues Klavier  for organ, Drehorgel and Maultrommel, 1970
Zeitspanne for piano, 1971–74
Souffle for two choirs and projections, 1972
Perspectives : pour clarinette en si b, 1977
Des Landes verwiesen / konzertante und szenische Aktionen, 1978, libretto: Jean-Pierre Faye
Rapport sonore / Relato sonoro / Klangbericht, musical radio feature, Karl-Sczuka-Preis 1983
Dialogue for piano and two Interpreters, 1983
Coral de caracola for organ, 1985
Transformations V for organ and chamber ensemble, 1987
Tagebuchgesänge after Franz Kafka and Lautréamont for two baritones and chamber orchestra, premiere 1987
Streichquartett, 1995
Walter Mehring – ein Wintermärchen / Imaginäre Szene für Bariton und Kammerensemble, 1998
Le Voyage, cantata for baritone and ten instruments, 2001
Transformations VII pour 14 instruments, 2003
Gegenträume / contre-rêves - radiophone Klangcollage, 2003
Wunde am Ende der Zeit - radiophone Klangcollage, 2003
Wandlungen - radiophone Klangcollage, 2005
Traumräume - radiophone Klangcollage, 2007
Cantate à trois for soprano, tenor, baritone and 4 ensembles, 2007

Selected discography 
Die Klaviermusik von Juan Allende-Blin, Thomas Günther, piano, Cybele SACD 160.401
Die Orgelmusik von Juan Allende-Blin, Gerd Zacher, organ, Cybele SACD 060.401

Publications 
 Kirchenmusik unter Hitler. In Hanns-Werner Heister, Hans-Günther Klein (Hg.): Musik und Musikpolitik im faschistischen Deutschland, Fischer Taschenbuch Verlag, Frankfurt a.M. 1984, .

Awards 
  (1983)
 Bundesverdienstkreuz am Bande (5 October 1999)
 Order of Merit of North Rhine-Westphalia (2009)
 National Prize for Musical Arts (Chile) (2018)

References

External links 
 
Juan Allende Blin - Universidad de Chile

Chilean composers
Chilean male composers
Academic staff of the University of Chile
Recipients of the Cross of the Order of Merit of the Federal Republic of Germany
1928 births
Living people
Chilean expatriates in Germany